Ralph Lysyshyn is the Ambassador Extraordinary and Plenipotentiary of Canada to the Russian Federation.

See also 
 Embassy of Canada in Moscow
Ralph Lysyshyn is a retired Canadian diplomat. He last served as Canadian Ambassador to Russia (with accreditation to Armenia and Uzbekistan) from 2006 to 2010.

Born in Canora, Saskatchewan, Ralph Lysyshyn graduated from McGill University (1969) and University of Alberta where he did his MA and Doctoral Studies in English literature.

He joined the Department of External Affairs in 1972.

Earlier he had a distinguished career in the Department of Foreign Affairs and International Trade in Ottawa (Head of Section, Eastern European Division; Director, Arms Control and Disarmament Division); he was also a policy advisor to the Prime Minister at the Privy Council Office, Director General, International Security & Arms Control Bureau and President, Forum of Federations.

His international career took him to Moscow where he was Third/Second Secretary at the Canadian Embassy (1974–1976); later he held positions of Counsellor, Canadian Embassy, Washington (1982–1986), Head of Chancery, Canadian Embassy, Lagos (1979–1982) and Deputy Permanent Representative, Canadian Delegation to NATO, Brussels (1990–1994). From 2002 to 2005 he was Ambassador to Poland and Belarus

References 

Year of birth missing (living people)
Living people
Ambassadors of Canada to Russia
Ambassadors of Canada to Belarus
Ambassadors of Canada to Poland
Ambassadors of Canada to Armenia
Ambassadors of Canada to Uzbekistan
McGill University alumni
University of Alberta alumni